The Pyle-National Company Plant is a historic industrial plant at 1334 North Kostner Avenue in the Humboldt Park neighborhood of Chicago, Illinois. The Pyle-National Company, which produced lights for steam locomotives and other heavy machinery, built the plant in 1916. The company was founded in 1897 by George C. Pyle, an inventor who patented several designs for locomotive headlights, and businessman Royal C. Vilas. The company's products became the first successful electric locomotive headlights, and the success of their and their competitors' lights led Congress to require electric headlights on all locomotives in 1915. Expecting increased business from the Congressional mandate, the company expanded to the Kostner plant, which had three buildings designed by the Chicago industrial architecture firm Davidson & Weiss. The plant served as Pyle-National's only production site until 1963 and was expanded several times in the intervening decades. While Pyle-National opened a new plant in South Carolina in 1963 and pivoted away from the lighting industry, it continued to use its Chicago factory until 1992.

The plant was added to the National Register of Historic Places on January 19, 2021.

References

Industrial buildings and structures on the National Register of Historic Places in Chicago
Industrial buildings completed in 1916